Hard Wired is the eighth full-length studio album by Front Line Assembly, released in 1995.

Release
Hard Wired was the band's first release for Off Beat. It has sold at least 50,000 copies worldwide. The limited edition with 5,000 copies was sold out in two weeks.

Coinciding with Front Line Assembly's tour through Europe in support of Improvised Electronic Device, Hard Wired was re-released in August 2011 by German label Black Rain Records as limited edition picture vinyl with a circulation of 500. It contains only seven songs and lacks the tracks "Mortal", "Modus Operandi" and "Transparent Species".

On the occasion of the 20th anniversary of Hard Wired in 2015, Canadian label Artoffact released a limited box set vinyl edition of the album with a circulation of 300 that included the Live Wired live album and the Circuitry single, all of which were remastered by Bill Leeb and Greg Reely.

Singles
Circuitry is the only single taken from Hard Wired. The limited edition came as a two CD Digipak packaging with different artwork that didn't include the second CD. This CD, titled Circuitry Disc 2, was part of the limited edition box of Hard Wired and packed in a slipcase. The first disc is a Mixed Mode CD and contains interactive content. It includes the official video for the track "Millennium" from the 1994 album of the same name and photo galleries. The data track is listed as first track titled "CD-ROM File" on the back cover. The track is only playable on computers running Windows and requires at least Windows 3.1. Disc 1 includes three remixes of "Circuitry" two of which are from Biosphere and Haujobb. The song "Epidemic" is a non-album track. The second disc includes another remix of "Circuitry" as well as non-album tracks "Destructive Transformation" and "Hydrogen". The idea to involve other artists in remixing originated from the label Off Beat.

Although the following single Plasticity did not appear on Hard Wired it evolved from the album's production process. "It is part of the same sessions", said Rhys Fulber in an interview with Sonic Boom Magazine. According to Fulber this was intentional and was already done with the Virus single: "We kept it off the album to release later [...] It gives people a reason to check it out because if you release it as a single that is already on album no one is really going to care." Along with the original version and a Haujobb remix the single features non-album track "Replicant". A video clip was shot in Vancouver for the track "Plasticity" which also received airplay on Much Music. The video won the award for Best Alternative Video at the 7th annual MuchMusic Video Awards in Toronto in 1996.

The track "Plasticity" is featured in the article series 101 Greatest Industrial Songs of All Time in COMA Music Magazine where it holds rank 70.

Most tracks of the singles were re-released in 1999 through Off Beat on the compilation album Explosion, together with tracks from the "Colombian Necktie" and "Comatose" singles. The timing of its release to coincide with the release of Implode was met with Bill Leeb's disapproval. Plasticity was re-released in 2012 by German record label Infacted Recordings, limited to 1,000 copies. The rereleased version contains the "Fatalist" single and the "Prophecy" single as additional tracks. A remastered vinyl version of the single was issued in July 2015 by Artoffact. Among the tracks already found on the original single it features another hitherto unpublished remix by Haujobb called "Plasticity (Dope Experience)".

Samples
Hard Wired makes extensive use of audio clips from a number of films.
 True Romance
 In the Mouth of Madness
 Lifeforce
 Stargate
 Speed
 The Puppet Masters
 No Escape
 Romeo Is Bleeding
 The Crow
 Lethal Weapon
 Alien 3
Some tracks use samples from Richard D. James songs, namely "Isopropanol" and "Dodeccaheedron" from his 1994 album Classics as well as "Isopropophlex" from his 1991 EP Analogue Bubblebath Vol I. Also sound effects of the video game Doom can be heard on Hard Wired.

Track listing

Personnel

Front Line Assembly
 Bill Leeb – production, programming, vocals, electronic instruments
 Rhys Fulber – production, programming, electronic instruments

Additional musicians
 Devin Townsend – electric guitar

Technical personnel
 Greg Reely – engineering, mixing
 Delwyn Brooks – assistant engineering
 Dave McKean – design, illustration, photography

Chart positions

Album

Singles

Circuitry

References

Front Line Assembly albums
1995 albums
Albums with cover art by Dave McKean
Metropolis Records albums
Albums produced by Rhys Fulber